Prince Nikolaos of Greece and Denmark (Greek: Νικόλαος; born 1 October 1969) is the third child of Constantine II (1940–2023) and Anne-Marie of Denmark, who were the last King and Queen of Greece, from 1964 to 1973.

Early life
Nikolaos was born at Casa di Cura Privata Nuova Villa Claudia in Rome, Italy, on October 1, 1969. He is the first royal child to be born in hospital from Constantine II of Greece and Anne-Marie of Denmark. His family had been living in exile since December 1967. His father was deposed in 1973 and the monarchy abolished on December 8, 1974.

He was baptized in the Greek Orthodox Church. His godparents were Princess Sofía, Princess of Spain (his paternal aunt), Princess Irene of Greece and Denmark (another paternal aunt), Crown Princess Margareta of Romania (his paternal second cousin), and Crown Prince Alexander of Yugoslavia (another paternal second cousin).

Education
Like his brothers and sisters, he was educated in the Hellenic College of London, founded by his parents in 1980. He attended Brown University in Rhode Island, graduating with an A.B. in International Relations. He has worked for Fox Television Network in New York, NatWest Markets in London and is currently working in his father's private office since 1998. He is a member of board of the Anna-Maria Foundation, designed to help victims of natural disasters like floods and earthquakes in Greece.

Nikolaos has an older sister Princess Alexia, an older brother Crown Prince Pavlos, a younger sister Princess Theodora, and a younger brother, Prince Philippos.

Engagement and marriage
Nikolaos's engagement to Tatiana Ellinka Blatnik, with whom he had been in a long term relationship, was announced on 28 December 2009, by the office of King Constantine in London. Until July 2010, when she resigned to concentrate on her wedding plans, Blatnik had worked in the publicity department as an event planner for fashion designer Diane von Fürstenberg.

The couple married in the Orthodox Church of St. Nicholas, Spetses, Greece on August 25, 2010.

Titles, styles, honors and arms

Titles

 October 1, 1969 – present: His Royal Highness Prince Nikolaos of Greece and Denmark

Honors
 House of Glücksburg-Greece: Grand Cross of the Royal Order of the Redeemer
 House of Glücksburg-Greece: Grand Cross of the Royal Order of Saints George and Constantine
 House of Glücksburg-Greece: Officer of the Royal Order of George I
 House of Glücksburg-Greece: Officer of Royal Order of the Phoenix
 : Recipient of the Silver Jubilee Medal of Queen Margrethe II
 : Order of Karađorđe's Star

Ancestry

References

1969 births
Living people
20th-century Greek people
21st-century Greek people
Greek princes
Danish princes
House of Glücksburg (Greece)
Nobility from Rome
Members of the Church of Greece
Brown University alumni
Sons of kings

Grand Crosses of the Order of Saints George and Constantine
Grand Crosses of the Order of George I
Grand Crosses of the Order of the Phoenix (Greece)
Italian people of Greek descent
Italian emigrants to the United Kingdom
Italian people of Danish descent
Italian people of Swedish descent
Children of Constantine II of Greece